The 45th congressional district of New York was a congressional district for the United States House of Representatives in New York. It was created in 1945 and eliminated as a result of the 1950 Census. For the entirety of its existence it was represented by Daniel A. Reed who was redistricted into the  after its demise.

List of members representing the district

Election results

1944

1946

1948

1950

References

Sources 

 Congressional Biographical Directory of the United States 1774–present
 Election Statistics 1920-present Clerk of the House of Representatives

45
Former congressional districts of the United States
1945 establishments in New York (state)
1953 disestablishments in New York (state)
Constituencies established in 1945
Constituencies disestablished in 1953